Meiji, the romanization of the Japanese characters 明  治 , may refer to:

Japanese history
 Emperor Meiji, Emperor of Japan between 1867 and 1912
 Meiji era, the name given to that period in Japanese history
 Meiji Restoration, the revolution that began the Meiji period
 Meiji Constitution, the constitution of the Empire of Japan between 1890 and 1947
 Meiji Shrine, a Shinto shrine dedicated to Emperor Meiji and his wife

Other uses

 Meiji Dairies, a major Japanese dairy company
 Meiji Mura, an open-air architectural museum near Nagoya, Japan
 Meiji Seamount, a seamount (underwater mountain) in the northern Pacific Ocean
 Meiji Seika, a major Japanese confectionery firm
 Meiji Senmon Gakkou, the former name of the Kyushu Institute of Technology
 Meiji University, a university in Tokyo
 Meiji Yasuda Life Insurance Company, a major Japanese life insurance company

See also
 Meijer, a grocery chain store in the American Midwest
 Měijì, Hanyu Pinyin for the Chinese name of Mischief Reef (美济礁)
 Meij (disambiguation)
 Meji, Indian ceremonial bonfire